Seoul Subway Line 5 of the Seoul Metro, dubbed the purple line, is a long line crossing from west to the east across the Seoul National Capital Area, South Korea. It is one of two subway lines in Seoul to cross under the Han River (the other being the Suin-Bundang Line), which is done at two points (between Mapo and Yeouinaru, and also between Gwangnaru and Cheonho). The main line runs through to Hanam Geomdansan Station while the branch line from Gangdong Station terminates at Macheon Station. In 2019, Line 5 carried an annual ridership of 334 million or about 915,000 passengers per day.

Upon opening, it was among the longest underground railway tunnels of any kind constructed. Today it is the 7th longest continuous underground subway tunnel in the world, just behind Chengdu Metro Line 6, Moscow Metro Bolshaya Koltsevaya Line, Guangzhou Metro Line 18, Guangzhou Metro Line 3, Beijing Subway Line 10 and Beijing Subway Line 6. Line 5 is also the first subway and passenger railway line in the Korean Peninsula to directly serve an airport, when the line was extended westward to Banghwa via Gimpo International Airport in 1996.

History 
The line was built 1990–1996 and is an important east–west link connecting Gimpo Airport, the Yeouido business area, downtown Seoul, and the Gangdong residential districts.

In 1996 Line 5 was implemented with Automatic train operation. However, it was deemed that a driver would be necessary in case of a breakdown of the automation system, therefore each subway train has one driver on board.

It was the world's longest underground railway line for 9 years until Guangzhou Metro Line 3 came into operation in 2005.

In December 2010 the line is recorded as having the third highest WiFi data consumption in the Seoul Metropolitan area. It averaged 1.67 times more than the other 14 subway lines fitted with WiFi service zones.

The main branch of the line was extended to the city of Hanam with a total of 5 stations spanning 7.7 km. The extension opened in two stages; the first opened on August 8, 2020, and the other opened on March 27, 2021.

Tourism
In January 2013, the Seoul Metropolitan Rapid Transit Corporation, which operated the line at the time, published free guidebooks features eight tours as well as recommendations for accommodations, restaurants and shopping centers. These guidebooks were printed in three languages: English, Japanese and Chinese (simplified and traditional). They were distributed from information centers on this line.

The tours are designed with different themes for travel along the subway lines, e.g. Korean traditional culture. The destinations range from Jongno 3-ga Station to Anguk Station and Gyeongbokgung Station on line No 3 showcasing antique shops and art galleries of Insa-dong.

In the summer of 2013, the Seoul Metropolitan Rapid Transit Corporation to display water parks that are located near stations operated by the Seoul Metropolitan Rapid Transit Corporation on the LCD display screens both inside the train, and on the station platforms.

Stations

Main Line

Macheon Branch

Rolling stock

Current

Seoul Metro 
 Seoul Metro 5000 series
 1st generation – since 1994
 2nd generation – since 1996
 3rd generation – since 2018
 4th generation – since 2021
 (Future) 5th generation – since 2024
 (Future) 6th generation – since 2026

See also 

 Subways in South Korea
 Seoul Metropolitan Rapid Transit Corporation
 Seoul Metropolitan Subway

References 

 
Seoul Metropolitan Subway lines
Airport rail links in South Korea
Railway lines opened in 1995